Guanggu 4th Road Station, is a station on Line 11 of the Wuhan Metro. It entered revenue service on October 1, 2018. It is located in Hongshan District.

Station layout

References

Wuhan Metro stations
Line 11, Wuhan Metro
Railway stations in China opened in 2018